Tazin Ahmed (30 July 1975 – 22 May 2018) was a Bangladeshi journalist, actress, playwright, director, and theater person. She won the 2003 Bachasas Award for the Best Actress in the drama category.

Early life and education
Ahmed was born on 30 July 1975, in Noakhali, Bangladesh, to Dilara Jolly. She completed her Higher Secondary School Certificate (HSC) in 1992. She graduated from the mass communication and journalism department of the University of Dhaka.

Career

Journalism
In 1994, Ahmed joined the newspaper Bhorer Kagoj. In 1997, she started working with Prothom Alo and became a staff reporter in 1998. She worked also as a columnist for Anondo Bhubon and as a freelance contributor to Bangla Bazar magazine. In 2002, she joined Mercantile Bank Limited as a public relations officer.

Acting
In 1996, Ahmed made her debut in the small screen through the single episode television drama Shesh Dekha Shesh Noy, directed by Sheikh Niamat Ali. Alongside she became associated with the theatre group Natyojon. In 2000, she joined another theatre group named Aronyak. She scripted around 12 plays and directed a few of them. She started her television presentation in 1991 with the program title of Chetna for Bangladesh Television. In 1997, she played in a number of plays for theater. Later, Aranyak acted in the drama Mayur Singhanshan. She wrote the screenplay of Doll's House.

She started working as a program executive at NTV in 2003. Since 2016, she hosted the television show 71 er Shokaal on Ekattor TV. Her last televised tele-fiction was Noashal, directed by Mir Sabbir.

Personal life and death 
Ahmed was first married to Ejaz Munna, a television director. She later married the musician Rumi Rahman. She was a niece of actress Dilara Zaman.

Ahmed was suffering from asthma. She died from heart attack on 22 May 2018 at the Regent Hospital in Uttara, Dhaka. Her body was taken for viewing to Kashimpur Women's Central Jail where her mother, Dilara Jolly, had been sentenced and later she was buried at her father's grave in Banani Graveyard.

Works

Television drama

Television show
Shandhikhon (2006)
71 er Shokaal

References

External links

1975 births
2018 deaths
Bangladeshi women journalists
Bangladeshi television actresses
Bangladeshi stage actresses
University of Dhaka alumni
People from Noakhali District
Burials at Banani Graveyard